Yanglinjie is a town of Yueyang County in Hunan, China. Through the amalgamation of villages in 2016, its divisions were reduced to eight villages from  25 villages, its seat is Chengshanzhou.

History
The township of Yanglin existed in the late period of Mingguo (1940s), it was a part of Tieshan Township in 1949 and of Tieshan Commune in 1958. It was incorporated as a commune from part of Tieshan in 1961. The commune was reorganized as a township in 1984.

Yanglin Township was reorganized as the town of Yanglinjie on November 17, 2017.

Subdivisions

References

Divisions of Yueyang County